Atrytonopsis lunus, the moon-marked skipper, is a species of grass skipper in the butterfly family Hesperiidae. It is found in Central America and North America.

The MONA or Hodges number for Atrytonopsis lunus is 4082.

References

Further reading

External links

 

Hesperiinae
Articles created by Qbugbot